Verismo——is used in English for 19th century realist movements in the arts in Italy: 

Verismo (music)
Verismo (painting)
Verismo (literature)